Micheline Francey (October 19, 1919 – January 1, 1969) was a French film actress.

Selected filmography
 The Chess Player (1938)
 The Phantom Carriage (1939)
 Le Corbeau (1943)
 Madly in Love (1943)
 A Cage of Nightingales (1945)
 François Villon (1945)
 The Village of Wrath (1947)
 The Woman I Murdered (1948)
 Marlene (1949)
 Sending of Flowers (1950)
 Quay of Grenelle (1950)
 Holiday for Henrietta (1952)
 Imperial Violets (1952)
 Little Jacques (1953)
 Rasputin (1954)
 The Dance (1962)

References

Bibliography
 Hayward, Susan. Les Diaboliques. University of Illinois Press, 2005.

External links

1919 births
1969 deaths
French film actresses
Actresses from Paris
20th-century French actresses
Burials at Batignolles Cemetery